Nong Khon Kwang railway station is a railway station located in Nong Khon Kwang Subdistrict, Mueang Udon Thani District, Udon Thani Province.

References 

Railway stations in Thailand
Udon Thani province